Nationalization of electricity in Quebec includes two series of events that led to the creation of Hydro-Québec in 1944 and the nationalization of private electricity companies in Quebec in two steps.

In 1944 the first nationalization allowed the province of Quebec to take control of Montreal Light, Heat and Power which had exercised a monopoly on the sale of electricity and gas in the Montreal area.  The second started in 1962 by the government of Jean Lesage was linked to the reforms of the Quiet Revolution which it was one of the main components of.

The two nationalizations of electricity allowed Hydro-Quebec to become one of the main producers of electricity in North America, to develop ambitious hydro-electric projects in the North of Quebec and to give Quebec's consumers low and consistent electrical rates.

See also 

 History of Hydro-Québec
 Quiet Revolution
 Quebec nationalism

References 

Energy in Quebec
Hydro-Québec
Politics of Quebec
History of Quebec
Nationalization